The Toronto Empire was a newspaper established in Toronto, Ontario, Canada, in 1887.  Founded by John A. Macdonald, the Prime Minister of Canada and publishing rival of George Brown of The Globe, it was the voice of the conservatives in the city.    Macdonald and Brown had been political rivals in Canada West (although they had co-operated to achieve Canadian confederation).  The Empire was founded when the previous conservative paper in Toronto,  The Toronto Mail, declared independence of any political party in 1886.

After Macdonald's death in 1891, the Empire merged with The Toronto Mail to form The Mail and Empire in 1895. The Mail and Empire merged with Brown's Globe to form The Globe and Mail in 1936.

See also
 List of newspapers in Canada

References

Newspapers published in Toronto
Publications established in 1887
Publications disestablished in 1895
Defunct newspapers published in Ontario
1887 establishments in Ontario
1895 disestablishments in Ontario
Conservative media in Canada